Train of Life (in French Train de vie; in Romanian Trenul vieţii) is a 1998 tragicomedy film by France, Belgium, Netherlands, Israel and Romania made in the French language. It tells the story of an eastern European Jewish village's plan to escape the Holocaust.

Plot 
The film starts off with a man, named Schlomo (Lionel Abelanski), running crazily through a forest, with his voice playing in the background, saying that he has seen the horror of the Nazis in a nearby town, and he must tell the others. Once he gets into town, he informs the rabbi, and together they run through the town and once they have got enough people together, they hold a town meeting. At first, many of the men do not believe the horrors they are being told, and many criticize Schlomo, for he is the town lunatic, and who could possibly believe him? But the rabbi believes him, and then they try to tackle the problem of the coming terrors. Amidst the pondering and the arguing, Schlomo suggests that they build a train, so they can escape by deporting themselves. Some of their members pretend to be Nazis in order to ostensibly transport them to a concentration camp, when in reality, they are going to Palestine via Russia. Thus the Train of Life is born.

On their escape route through rural Eastern Europe, the train sees tensions between its inhabitants, close encounters with real Nazis as well as Communist partisans, and fraternization with the Roma, until the community arrives just at the frontlines between German and Soviet fire.

Its ends with the voice-over of Schlomo himself, who tells the stories of his companions after the arrival of the train in the Soviet Union: Some went on to Palestine, some stayed in the Soviet Union, and some even made it to America. As he is telling this, a cut to a close-up of his face happens as he says, "That is the true story of my shtetl...", but then the camera makes a quick zoom-out, revealing him grinning and wearing prisoner's clothes behind the barbed wire of a concentration camp, and he ends with, "Ye nu, almost the true story!"

Cast 
 Lionel Abelanski as Schlomo
 Rufus as Mordechai
 Clément Harari as the Rabbi
 Michel Muller as Yossi
 Agathe de la Fontaine as Esther
 Johan Leysen as Schmecht
 Bruno Abraham-Kremer as Yankele
 Marie-José Nat as Sura
 Gad Elmaleh as Manzatou

Background 
In 1996, Roberto Benigni, writer-director of Train of Life'''s perceived competitor Life Is Beautiful, had been sent the script to Train of Life and offered the role of village idiot Shlomo by writer-director Mihăileanu, but Benigni turned it down and afterwards went to write and direct Life Is Beautiful.King, Greg. Train of Life Reviews, MovieFix Mihăileanu refuses to publicly discuss whether Benigni has plagiarized his film, instead preferring to say that he and Benigni have made "two very different films".

Writer-director Mihăileanu said that reporters came to ask him about Shlomo's ultimate fate which the film leaves open, whether he will perish during the war or if he will survive. Mihăileanu said, "At first, I didn't know how to answer this one. But then I found the right answer: It's up to you in the audience! If you'll forget Shlomo, he'll die. But if you'll remember him, he'll live forever."

 Critical reception Train of Life holds a 64% 'Fresh' rating on review aggregator Rotten Tomatoes. Assigning a more weighted average (based on 15 reviews), Metacritic assigns Train of Life with a metascore of 62, indicating "Generally favorable reviews," with the following summary: "This haunting and powerful comedy is both the story of a village's dream and a suspenseful tale of great escape."

Many reviewers at the time drew comparisons between Train of Life and its contemporary competitor films Life Is Beautiful and Jakob the Liar, because all three were released to North American theaters in 1999, but Train of Life had been the first in production. While Jakob the Liar was near-universally panned, critics were divided upon which out of the other two worked better as a "Holocaust comedy".

While Desson Howe of the Washington Post called Train of Life a "less-than-scintillating spin on Life Is Beautiful", James Berardinelli of ReelViews found the film's comedy "too 'French' in nature — which is to say that it tends towards silliness and slapstick." Rob Blackwelder of SlicedWire (while not opposed to the idea of Holocaust tragicomedies in general) found each of the three films suffering from their distinct own flaws. Jim Sullivan of the Boston Globe (without mentioning Jakob the Liar) found that it "works much better" than Life Is Beautiful. Jean Oppenheimer of the Dallas Observer praised Train of Life as being "far superior to either" of the other two, and Henry Cabot Beck of Film.com went as far as comparing it to Spielberg's Academy Award-winning 1993 Holocaust drama, calling Train of Life "every bit as reverent as Schindler's List and no less successful" and contending about its two 1999 competitors that "neither film was as well directed or acted" as Train of Life. Stefan Steinberg of the World Socialist Web Site claimed that Train of Life is "a far better film" than Life Is Beautiful, being impressed by "the immense affection and care with which Mihaileanu has recreated the life and self deprecating humour of the Jewish villagers."

Several American reviewers saw a distinct similarity between Mihăileanu's filmic yarn and the mood and humor found in the writings of Isaac Bashevis Singer or Sholem Aleichem.Savlov, Marc (1999). Train of Life, Austin Chronicle, December 24, 1999 Many reviewers made favorable comparisons to both Ernst Lubitsch's 1942 version or Mel Brooks's 1983 version of To Be Or Not To Be (citing the same clever wit), positive and negative comparisons to Brooks's 1968 The Producers (calling it either better, worse, or "just as bad" as Brooks's farce), or negatively compared the oftentimes more buffoonish than scary Nazis in the film to the TV series Hogan's Heroes.Bertrand, Merle (2000). TRAIN DE VIE (TRAIN OF LIFE), Film Threat, March 16, 2000Kaltenbach, Chris (1999). Train of Life never becomes Beautiful, Baltimore Sun, November 12, 1999

 Review quotes 

{{blockquote|Mihaileanu goes to great pains to emphasize the tragedy of the circumstances, although he does so in a somewhat belated and unconventional manner. [...] An important question for viewers of Train of Life is whether a tremendous ending can redeem an otherwise mediocre motion picture. [...] For that reason, Train of Life is one of the few films that works better on subsequent viewings than on the initial one. [...] Ultimately, however, the ending is what will determine how each individual reacts to Train of Life. Someone who walks out midway through the film will have a different perspective than those who stay to the start of the closing credits, since much of what is provocative and interesting about the movie is introduced during the brief epilogue. While this is not the ideal way to structure a motion picture [...], there's no doubt that Train of Life's resolution leaves a forceful impression.|James Berardinelli: Train of Life (Train de Vie) (ReelViews)}}

 Awards 
Among other American and international awards, Train of Life won both the FIPRESCI Prize for Best First Feature and the Anicaflash Prize at the 55th Venice International Film Festival, the World Cinema Audience Award: Dramatic at the 1999 Sundance Film Festival, and the Best Foreign Language Film Award'' at the Las Vegas Film Critics Society Awards 1999.

References

External links 

Train de Vie (Train of Life) (1998) on Rotten Tomatoes
Train of Life on Metacritic

1998 films
1990s war comedy-drama films
Tragicomedy films
Films about Jews and Judaism
Films directed by Radu Mihăileanu
Films scored by Goran Bregović
Films shot in Bucharest
1990s French-language films
French war comedy-drama films
Holocaust films
Films about refugees
Rail transport films
Romanian comedy-drama films
Films about Romani people
1998 comedy-drama films
Romanian war films
1990s French films